Teller House is a historic hotel in Central City, Colorado.  Built in 1872, the building now serves as a restaurant.

The bar at the Teller House is well known for the "Face on the Barroom Floor," a painting of a woman's face on the wooden floor, done in 1936 by local artist Herndon Davis, as a joke after being fired by the Teller House.

The building opened in 1991 as a casino, which operated until 2000. A new management company reopened the casino in 2005, but it closed again later that year.

See also
List of casinos in Colorado
National Register of Historic Places listings in Gilpin County, Colorado

References

External links

Rouge Steakhouse at The Teller House - Central City, CO
Teller House - Central City photo
Teller House in Central City becomes casino

Central City, Colorado
Casinos in Colorado
Hotel buildings on the National Register of Historic Places in Colorado
Restaurants in Colorado
Hotels established in 1872
Romanesque Revival architecture in Colorado
Hotel buildings completed in 1872
Buildings and structures in Gilpin County, Colorado
1872 establishments in Colorado Territory
National Register of Historic Places in Gilpin County, Colorado